Peter barracks — a historical monument in Taganrog, Russia, that was built at the end of the 18th century. Is a part of «combined arms cell» of Taganrog Fortress. It is also a valuable object of cultural heritage of federal importance.

History 
On 7 December 1803, the garrison battalion of st. Dmitry of Rostov Fortress were moved to Taganrog. It was planned to form there a regiment that would consist of two battalions, so the construction of new barracks for this purpose began. Ten «standard» buildings were built, each having soldier barracks, officer hall and kitchen. Every building was surrounded by a two-meter fence.

Nowadays only one «standard» building still stands. Its original layout has been changed a little since the time of construction. The walls of barracks are made of brick, and the brickwork is as thick as 2,5 bricks. At the facade of barracks there are sixteen rectangular windows. The roof has two sloping surfaces. In the past, all the windows had frameworks inside, but now only one window still has it.

In the 1910s the building was occupied by a penitentiary orphanage. In the 1920s there was a prison for juvenile offenders. In 1937 the buildings were redesigned for living spaces.

Museum 
By 1998, the barracks were a property of Taganrog Historical-Architectural Reserve and local cossack organization. There are plans for restoration and establishment of the museum called «Taganrog Fortress Barracks». Soldier barracks, officer hall, kitchen, powder magazine and well are to become part of museum complex.

In 2007 town's administration discussed an idea of establishing «Naval Glory Museum». This proposal was rejected because «it found no support in the Ministry of Culture of Rostov oblast». This proposal was rejected because «it found no support in the Ministry of Culture of Rostov oblast».

In January 2012, the administration of Taganrog decided to establish museum center «Peter barracks» and merge it with Faina Ranevskaya Museum and Alexander I Museum. The project will be called «Taganrog Museum Complex». Establishment is estimated to be finished by 2018.

References 

Museums in Taganrog
Cultural heritage monuments in Taganrog
Buildings and structures in Taganrog
Cultural heritage monuments of federal significance in Rostov Oblast